Rhinella horribilis is the scientific name used for populations of the cane toad or giant toad located in Mesoamerica and north-western South America when they are considered to be a separate species from Rhinella marina, a name which is then mostly restricted to Amazon basin populations. R. horribilis was originally described from Mexico as Bufo horribilis before later being considered a synonym of Bufo marina and later Rhinella marina. The specific epithet horribilis has now been revived after a 2016 study argued that these populations in fact make up two separate species.

References

horribilis
Amphibians described in 1833
Taxa named by Arend Friedrich August Wiegmann